Jomehi (also Romanized as Jom‘eh’ī; also known as Jomne‘ī) is a village in Piveshk Rural District, Lirdaf District, Jask County, Hormozgan Province, Iran. At the 2006 census, its population was 89, in 22 families.

References 

Populated places in Jask County